The Sugar River State Trail is a  long, recreation rail trail in Wisconsin. 

This trail connects four communities: New Glarus, Monticello, Albany and Brodhead.  The limestone-surfaced trail is on an abandoned railroad bed, and is used for bicycling, hiking, and snowmobiling. The trail follows the course of the Little Sugar and Sugar River and includes several trestle bridges. 

The Sugar River State Trail is part of the Aldo Leopold Legacy Trail System, linking with the Badger State Trail near Monticello. It also hosts a  portion of the Ice Age Trail.

The north end of the trail is at a parking lot next to the New Glarus Depot on Railroad St. in downtown New Glarus.  The south end of the trail is on Decatur Rd. at the intersection with W. 3rd Av. in Brodhead.

See also
List of bike trails in Wisconsin
List of hiking trails in Wisconsin
Rail trails

References

External links
Sugar River State Trail Hiking Information
Wisconsin Department of Natural Resources Sugar River State Trail
Link to Sugar River  Trail
Wisconsin Sugar River Trail (GPS and map)

Rail trails in Wisconsin
National Recreation Trails in Wisconsin
Protected areas of Green County, Wisconsin
Protected areas of Rock County, Wisconsin